Palamadai Muthuswamy Ramachandran, PVSM, AVSM, SC, VM (24 February 1935 – 6 May 2021) was an Indian Air Force officer.

Ramachandran was commissioned as a pilot into the fighter stream of the Indian Air Force in 1955. He participated in the Liberation of Goa in 1961 where he destroyed the Portuguese patrol boat N.R.P. Vega for which he was awarded a Shaurya Chakra.

Ramachandran qualified as an experimental Test Pilot at the Empire Test Pilots' School in the UK, where he was awarded the Edward's Award for best all-around progress in the course. He then did extensive test flying at various Indian Air Force and HAL establishments, including on the Jaguar, MiG-21, MiG-23 and MiG-25 aircraft. Ramachandran was the first pilot from outside the Soviet Bloc to be permitted to fly the MiG-25 Foxbat in 1979.

Ramachandran's command and staff appointments during his career include: Commanding Officer, 28 Sqn, IAF; set up and first Commanding Officer of the IAF Experimental Test Pilot's School; Commandant, Aircraft & Systems Testing Establishment; Air Officer Commanding, Air Force Station, Ambala and Vice Chief of Air Staff. As Vice Chief, Ramachandran was responsible for the operational deployment of India's short range ballistic missile, Prithvi.

Ramachandran was a graduate of the Defence Services Staff College and National Defence College, a Fellow of the Royal Aeronautical Society and Member of the Aeronautical Society of India.

Military awards and decorations
Ramachandran was awarded the PVSM, AVSM, SC and VM in his career with the Indian Air Force that lasted almost four decades.

Param Vishisht Seva Medal citation

Ati Vishisht Seva Medal citation

Shaurya Chakra citation
Air Marshal Ramachandran was awarded the Shaurya Chakra for operations during the Liberation of Goa. The citation reads as follows:

Vayu Sena Medal citation

References 

1935 births
2021 deaths
Vice Chiefs of Air Staff (India)
Indian Air Force air marshals
Indian Air Force officers
Indian aviators
Recipients of the Shaurya Chakra
Recipients of the Param Vishisht Seva Medal
Recipients of the Ati Vishisht Seva Medal
Recipients of the Vayu Sena Medal
Defence Services Staff College alumni
National Defence College, India alumni